Dudley Buck (March 10, 1839October 6, 1909) was an American composer, organist, and writer on music. He published several books, most notably the Dictionary of Musical Terms and Influence of the Organ in History, which was published in New York City in 1882.

He is best known today for his organ composition, Concert Variations on The Star-Spangled Banner, Op. 23, which was later arranged into an orchestral version.

Life and career
Born in Hartford, Connecticut, Buck was the son of a merchant who gave him every opportunity to cultivate his musical talents. After attending Trinity College, for four years (1858–1862) he studied in Leipzig at the Leipzig Conservatory where his teachers included Louis Plaidy, Hauptmann, Schneider, and Moscheles. He then pursued further studies in Dresden (again with Schneider) and Paris. On returning to America he held positions of organist in Hartford's North Congregational Church, Chicago's St. James' Episcopal Church (1869), and Boston at the Music Hall Association and at New England Conservatory (1871).

In 1875 Buck went to New York City for a prolonged and professionally fruitful period. He assisted Theodore Thomas as conductor of orchestral concerts, including the Central Park Garden Concerts. In 1877 he began a 25-year post as organist at Holy Trinity Church in Brooklyn. He founded the Apollo Club, an organization dedicated to promoting choral music in Brooklyn, likely molded after the Apollo Club founded in Boston in 1871. 

The U.S. Centennial commissioned a cantata from Buck and Sidney Lanier; it was performed at the exposition's opening day on May 10, 1876. In 1898 Buck was elected to the National Institute of Arts and Letters.

Towards the end of his tenure at Holy Trinity, new church leadership publicly expressed criticism with the church's music program. In 1901 it led to Buck announcing his resignation from Holy Trinity effective May 1902, whereupon he took the job of organist and choirmaster at Plymouth Congregational Church in Brooklyn. This position lasted only a year, before Buck retired and spent the next few years with his wife in Germany.

He returned to the United States in 1909, and died a few months later at his son's house in West Orange, New Jersey. His funeral was held at Grace Episcopal Church in Manhattan; his own compositions In Memoriam and Over the Treetops There Is Rest were sung by the Apollo Club. He was buried in Rosedale Cemetery in Montclair, New Jersey (the same burial site as other notable hymn composers Lowell Mason, Mary Artemisia Lathbury, and George Webb).

Several memorials were held after his death, including one led by E. H. Joyce in October 1910 at Bridgeport's First Presbyterian Church, and one led by John Hyatt Brewer (who had replaced Buck as conductor of the Apollo Club in 1903) in January 1911 in Brooklyn's Lafayette Avenue Presbyterian Church.

Buck also taught private music lessons throughout his career. Among his notable pupils were Charles Ives, Paul Ambrose, C. B. Hawley, William Howland, Daniel Protheroe, Harry Rowe Shelley, James Francis Cooke, and Charles Sanford Skilton.

Writings 
Buck's published books include:

 Buck's New and Complete Dictionary of Musical Terms (1873)
 Illustrations in Choir Accompaniment with Hints on Registration (1877)
 The Influence of the Organ in History (1882)
 Musical Pronouncing Dictionary (in at least 8 editions)
 Some Thoughts for the Singer (1908)

Compositions 
Buck was a prolific composer, in spite of having lost most of his manuscripts in St. James Episcopal Church's 1871 fire. His works include operas, cantatas, anthems, sacred songs, and organ works. Among them are:

Choral works:

 Motette Collection (1869)
 The Legend of Don Munio, op. 64 (1874), setting of Washington Irving text (a chapter from Tales of the Alhambra) for small chorus and orchestra
 The Centennial Meditation of Columbia (1876), a cantata, text by Sidney Lanier, commissioned for the U.S. Centennial and performed at its opening ceremony.
 The Nun of Nidaros, op. 83 (1879), setting of Longfellow text for chorus, soloists, piano obligato, reed organ, and string quartet ad libitum.
 Golden Legend (1880)
 King Olaf's Christmas (1881), setting of Longfellow text for chorus, soloists, piano obligato, reed organ, and string quartet ad libitum.
 Voyage of Columbus (1885)
 The Light of Asia (1886)
 The Triumph of God
 In Memoriam
 Over the Treetops There Is Rest

Songs:

 Three Songs for Mezzo-Soprano (Where are the Swallows Fled?, Down by the Mill, The Sunset's Smile has Left the Sky)
 Five Songs for alto or baritone (Morning Land, Spring Song, Expectancy, Sunset (based on Sidney Lanier poem), Storm and Sunshine)
 Five Songs for tenor or soprano (Thou art Mine!, Shadow Land, I Love Thee, The Silent World is Sleeping, Creole Lover's Song)
 Five Songs for Baritone (Where the Lindens Bloom, Bedouin Love Song, The Capture of Bacchus, The Gypsies, When Life Hath Sorrow Found)
 Five Songs for mezzo-soprano or baritone (In June, Love's Remorse, Alone!, Spring's Awakening, Crossing the Bar)
 Evening Song, op. 76
 Twilight
 Boots and Saddles (A Soldier's Farewell)
 Falstaff's Song
 There's a Merry Brown Thrush
 The Tempest (Dramatic Poem)
 Where Did You Come From, Baby Dear?
 Why Love is King

Operas:

 Serâpis, an unperformed grand opera
 Deseret (1880, comic opera, survives only in fragments)

Orchestral:

 Marmion, symphonic overture
 a symphony in E-flat

Organ:

 an organ symphony, said to be the first American organ symphony
 Grand Sonata in E-flat for organ
 Variations and Fugue on the "Star-Spangled Banner

References

External links

Dudley Buck at Music of the United States of America (MUSA)

Art of the States: Dudley Buck
Library of Congress Biography page
Sheet music for "Sunset", New York: G. Schirmer, 1877, from the Alabama Sheet Music Collection

1839 births
1909 deaths
19th-century American composers
19th-century classical composers
19th-century American male musicians
20th-century American composers
20th-century American male musicians
20th-century classical composers
American classical organists
American male classical composers
American male organists
American opera composers
American Romantic composers
American writers about music
Cathedral organists
Male opera composers
Musicians from Hartford, Connecticut
Trinity College (Connecticut) alumni
Male classical organists
19th-century organists